Homosassa incudella is a species of snout moth in the genus Homosassa. It was described by Jay C. Shaffer in 1968. It was described from Oklahoma.

References

Moths described in 1968
Anerastiini